Ercole Procaccini the Elder (1520 – 1595) was an Italian painter of the Renaissance period, mainly active in Milan.

He was born in Bologna. He painted an Annunciation for the church of San Benedetto, a Conversion of St. Paul and a Christ in the Garden for San Giacomo Maggiore, a St. Michael defeating the rebel Angels for San Bernardo,  and a Deposition from the Cross for the church of Santo Stefano. Ercole established an academy at Milan, which became  celebrated in his time, and, besides his own sons (Carlo Antonio, Giulio Cesare and Camillo turned out distinguished artists of the Milan school.  The painter Ercole Procaccini the Younger was Carlo Antonio's son.

References
    

16th-century Italian painters
Italian male painters
Italian Renaissance painters
Painters from Bologna
Painters from Milan
1520 births
1595 deaths